Pleasant Creek State Recreation Area is a  state recreation area in Linn County, Iowa, United States, near the city of Palo. The recreation area is home to the  Pleasant Creek Lake. Both the lake and the park were formed in the 1960s to provide eastern Iowa with a large recreational lake.

Pleasant Creek Lake features four boat ramps and a kayak launch, and its clear water makes it a popular site for scuba diving. The lake also has several fishing jetties; fish living in the lake include channel catfish, muskellunge, largemouth bass, and white bass. The entire recreation area is also open to hunting. The park includes  of multi-use trails used for hiking, horseback riding, mountain biking, and skiing and snowmobiling in the winter. It also has three modern campsites and four camping cabins.

References

State parks of Iowa
Protected areas of Linn County, Iowa